Ferdinand Steinvorth Neverman (born June 16, 1973) is a Costa Rican slalom canoer who competed in the early-to-mid 1990s. He finished 43rd in the K-1 event at the 1992 Summer Olympics in Barcelona.

References
Sports-Reference.com profile

1973 births
Canoeists at the 1992 Summer Olympics
Costa Rican male canoeists
Living people
Olympic canoeists of Costa Rica
Place of birth missing (living people)